Michael Romanov or Michael of Russia (1596–1645) was the first Russian Tsar of the house of Romanov.

Michael Romanov may also refer to:
 Grand Duke Michael Pavlovich of Russia (1798–1849)
 Grand Duke Michael Mikhailovich of Russia (1861–1929)
 Mikhail Alexandrovich Romanov (1878–1918), arguably Tsar Mikhail II for one day after the abdication of Nicholas II
 Mikhail Romanov (footballer) (1895–1961), Russian international footballer
 Michael Romanoff (1890–1971), owner of Romanoff's restaurant in Los Angeles
 Mikhail Timofeyevich Romanov (1891–1941), Red Army major general
 Mikhail Romanov (politician) (born 1989), Russian politician